Modern reenactment is historical reenactment of events of the modern period, most commonly events from the 18th century to the present.

The period starts with events such as the Seven Years' War, the Napoleonic Wars, and the peak of the Royal Navy's power.

The Victorian era is included, although not as well covered in terms of events as the major battles before and after it, with the notable exception of the American Civil War, which has a large and active community of reenactors.

Depictions of 20th century events such as World War II, the Korean War, and the Vietnam War are more firmly classified as modern reenactment.

The period includes the development of firearms, from musket and cannon to automatic weapons, and vehicles.

External links

 
Historical reenactment by period
Reenactment